This is the results breakdown of the local elections held in Navarre on 8 May 1983. The following tables show detailed results in the autonomous community's most populous municipalities, sorted alphabetically.

Overall

City control
The following table lists party control in the most populous municipalities, including provincial capitals (shown in bold). Gains for a party are displayed with the cell's background shaded in that party's colour.

Municipalities

Burlada
Population: 14,519

Estella
Population: 12,230

Pamplona
Population: 177,906

Tafalla
Population: 9,957

Tudela
Population: 24,953

See also
1983 Navarrese regional election

References

Navarre
1983